Shieldhill is a village within the Falkirk council area in Central Scotland.

Shieldhill is divided into a few main parts: " The California end" and the old " scheme end " to the west, and the newer Bovis and the original old miners rows which have existed in some way for approximately 150 years. The main road through Shieldhill is the B8028 road between California and Glen Village and the B810 road from Reddingmuirhead. At the time of the 2001 census, Shieldhill had a population of 2,656 residents.

Amenities
There are two corner shops, a bar, The C Side chippy and the spicy cottage takeaway as well as a Post Office in Shieldhill. There is also a wedding centre nearby, The Three Kings.

The village of Shieldhill has one primary school, Shieldhill Primary School.

Governance
The village forms part of the Falkirk constituency for UK general elections and part of the Falkirk East constituency in Scottish Parliament elections.

See also
Falkirk Braes villages
List of places in Falkirk council area

References

External links

Canmore - Easter Shieldhill site record

Villages in Falkirk (council area)
Grangemouth
Mining communities in Scotland